The 2021–22 Muktijoddha Sangsad KC's season was the 41st competitive highest level season.
This season will remarks 14th existence season overall in Bangladesh football. The season were covered period from 1 October  2021– 2 August 2022.

Season summary

November
On 28 November Mutijoddha Sangsad KC started their new football season journey with losing by 1–2 goals against Dhaka Mohammedan. A goal scored by Japanese forward Tetsuaki Misawa but its couldn't help to win the match.

December
On 2 December Muktijoddha Sangsad KC has meet against Saif Sporting Club and they defeated by 3–2 goals. Early goals by Foysal Ahmed Fahim, Nasirul Islam gave lead SSC before half time. In the second half Saif SC Sazzad Hossain gave the 3-0 lead. In the 85 & 90 minutes two goals by Japanese forward Tetsuaki Misawa of Muktijoddha Sangsad KC give them hope but before last whistle of referee they won't managed win or draw.

On 6 December Muktijoddha Sangsad KC drew 1–1 goals against Bangladesh Army football team. On 8 minutes Egyptian forward Ahmed Samsaldin gave lead and with the lead finished first half. In the send half on 87 minutes goal by Bangladesh Army Shamimul Haque level the scored both teams share points.

On 26 December Muktijoddha Sanhsad KC lost 3–0 to Sheikh Jamal DC by FIFA Walkover laws. The match scheduled to play but the club withdrew their name from the tournament.

On 28 December Muktijoddha Sanhsad KC lost 3–0 to Rahmatganj MFS by FIFA Walkover laws. The match scheduled to play following date but the club withdrew their name from the tournament. As per FIFA Walkover laws opposition club declared winner of the match.

February
On 4 February Muktijoddha Sangsad KC has meet versus Dhaka Abahani in their away match and lost by 0–1 goal. In the first half on 12 minutes Brazilian forward Dorielton goals got lead played first half 1–0 goal lead. In the second half both teams are played goalless and Dhaka Abahani got three points. Muktijoddha Sangsad KC finished season first match with a result 1–0

On 8 February Muktijoddha Sangsad KC lost home match by 0–3 against Muktijoddha Sangsad KC. In the first half on 20 minutes a goal by Sheikh Jamal DC Solomon King Kanform made score 1–0 and on 35 minutes a goal by Matthew Chinedu made score 2–0 before finished half time break. In the second half  on 57 minutes a goals by Matthew Chinedu scoreline made 3–0. Muktijoddha Sangsad KC players would able to score any goal against Sheikh Jamal DC until ended the game. Sheikh Jamal DC graved the victory with 3–0. 

On 12 February Muktijoddha Sangsad KC lost by 0–1 goals against Bashundhara Kings in away match. First half both team played excellent football and finished by 0–0 score. In the second half on 58 minutes Brazilian forward Robson goal took lead Kings and they have finished it 1–0. Muktijoddha SKC players tried to play attacking football but it wasn't not enough to equalized score.

On 19 February Muktijoddha Sangsad KC lost by 1–2 goals at home ground versus Uttar Baridhara Club. In the first half both teams played goalless. In the second half on 58 minutes a goal by Arif Hossain Uttar Baridhara took lead and on 64 minutes a goal by Sujon Biswas made score 2–0 but on 88 minutes Japanese Soma Otani score for Muktijoddha Sangsad KC. Muktijoddha Sangsad KC have lost 4 matches in a row.

On 25 February Muktijoddha Sangsad KC defeated by 2–1 goals  Swadhinata KS at home match. In the first half both teams played goalless. In the second half on 54 minutes Nedo Turković score gave lead Swadhinata KS but on 81 minutes Muktijoddha Sangsad KC equalized score 1–1 by own goal of Hasan Murad Swadhinata KS. After 2 minutes Japanese Tetsuaki Misawa goal made score 2–1 Muktijoddha Sangsad KC and Muktijoddha Sangsad KC graved the first victory of Premier League football.

March
On 2 March Muktijoddha Sangsad KC lost by 0–1 goals versus Bangladesh Police FC at home ground.

On 7 March Muktijoddha Sangsad KC have lost by 0–1 goal against Rahmatganj MFS at home ground.

On 12 March Muktijoddha Sangsad KC got victory against Sheikh Russel KC by 3–0 goals in the away match.

On 18 March Muktijoddha Sangsad KC lost by 1–2 goals against Dhaka Mohammedan in the away match.

April
On 3 April Muktijoddha Sangsad KC lost by 1–2 goals against Chittagong Abahani in the away game.

On 8 April Muktijoddha Sangsad KC have drew against Saif Sporting Club by 3–3 goals at home ground.

On 25 April Muktijoddha Sangsad KC have defeated to Dhaka Abahani by  3–4 goals at home ground.

May
On 7 May Muktijoddha Sangsad KC have lost over Bashundhara Kings by 2–3 at home game.

On 13 May Muktijoddha Sangsad KC have drew versus Uttar Baridhara Club by 1–1 in the away game.

June
On 23 June Muktijoddha Sangsad KC got victory against Swadhinata KS by 1–0 goal in the away game.

On 29 June Muktijoddha Sangsad KC have defeated to Bangladesh Police FC by 1–4 goals at home ground.

July
On 4 July Muktijoddha Sangsad KC have thrashed Rahmatganj MFS with score 1–7 in the away ground.

On 15 July Muktijoddha Sangsad KC have drawn with score 0–0 at home match against Sheikh Russel KC.

On 21 July Muktijoddha Sangsad KC have beat Dhaka Mohammedan by 2–1 goals at home ground.

On 27 July Muktijoddha Sangsad KC have drew against Chittagong Abahani by 1–1 goals at home.

On 31 July Muktijoddha Sangsad KC have won against Saif Sporting Club by 3–2 goals in the away game.

Current squad
Muktijoddha Sangsad KC squad for 2021–22 season.

Pre-season friendly

Transfer

In

Out

Loans In

Competitions

Overall

Overview

Independence Cup

Group stages

Group C

Federation Cup

Group stages

Group D

Premier League

League table

Results summary

Results by round

Matches

Statistics

Goalscorers

Source: Matches

References

Muktijoddha Sangsad KC
2021 in Bangladeshi football
2022 in Bangladeshi football
Bangladeshi football club records and statistics